Mariachi Plaza station is an underground light rail station on the L Line of the Los Angeles Metro Rail system. It is located under 1st Street at its at the intersection of Boyle Avenue, with the main exit located at Mariachi Plaza, after which the station is named. The plaza is the historic gateway to the Boyle Heights neighborhood of Los Angeles. This station opened in 2009 as part of the Gold Line Eastside Extension and was one of two underground stations on the Eastside Extension (the other being Soto). This station and all the other Eastside Extension stations will be part of the E Line upon completion of the Regional Connector project in 2023.

Until 1963, the Los Angeles Railway's P Line yellow streetcars operated on the surface of 1st Street, including a stop near this station.

Service

Station layout
This station is one of two underground stations on the Eastside portion of the L Line (the other being Soto). There are two levels underground: a mezzanine with ticket machines and gates, and below that, an island platform with two tracks. There is one entrance to the station at the intersection of 1st Street and Boyle Avenue, at the namesake Mariachi Plaza.

Hours and frequency

Connections 
, the following connections are available:
 Los Angeles Metro Bus: ,

Nearby attractions

Hollenbeck Park
Mariachi Plaza
White Memorial Medical Center

References

External links

L Line (Los Angeles Metro) stations
Boyle Heights, Los Angeles
Eastside Los Angeles
Railway stations in the United States opened in 2009